Clemente Rolón (born 23 November 1951) is a Paraguayan footballer. He played in four matches for the Paraguay national football team in 1975. He was also part of Paraguay's squad for the 1975 Copa América tournament.

References

External links
 

1951 births
Living people
Paraguayan footballers
Paraguay international footballers
Association football forwards
Sportspeople from Asunción